Hashim bey Miriman oglu Vazirov – was an Azerbaijani journalist, writer and publisher.

Biography
Hashim bey Vazirov was born and had his primary education in Shusha. After graduating from Irevan Teachers’ Seminary, he worked as a teacher in Irevan, Barda, Shaki and Shusha. In the 1890s, being a teacher in real school in Shusha, H. Vazirov participated in organization of spectacles along with other teachers. In 1895, they staged “Marrying – not slaking the thirst” play by H.Vazirov. In these years Vazirov translated Othello by Shakespeare into Azerbaijani. Vazirov acted as Othello in a spectacle staged in Shusha, in 1904. Hashimbey Vazirov was the author of such plays as School education, Don’t knock my door – or your door will be knocked, Marrying – not slaking the thirst. He wrote articles dedicated to enlightenment, science, socio-political issues. He worked as the editor of “Irshad” newspaper at different times, published “Teze hayat” newspaper, edited such newspapers as “Ittifag”, “Seda”, “Sadayi-hagg” and “Sadayi-Gafgaz”.

References

Publications
 Везиров Г. Мои воспоминания о «Мектебе».- KB, 1901, № 2, с. 39-48 (паг. 2-я).

External links
 Анвар Чингизоглы. Родословная Везировы. «Сой», Баку, 2008.
 Ингилаб Керимов. Становление и развитие азербайджанского театра. «Элм», Баку, 1991.

1868 births
1916 deaths
Azerbaijani journalists
Azerbaijani educators
Azerbaijani nobility
Writers from Shusha